Rebecca H. (Return to the Dogs) is a 2010 French-American drama film directed by Lodge Kerrigan. It was entered into the Un Certain Regard section of the 2010 Cannes Film Festival.

Cast
 Géraldine Pailhas as Rebecca Herry / Géraldine Pailhas
 Pascal Greggory as Jérôme Herry / Pascal Greggory
 Magali Woch as Passerby (as Magalie Woch)
 Lodge Kerrigan as Director
 Ilan Cohen as Translator
 Paco Boublard as Neighborhood Teenager
 Jérémy Lornac as Neighborhood Teenager
 Louise Szpindel as Neighborhood Teenager
 Nicolas Moreau as Angry Neighbor
 Antoine Régent as Travel Agent
 Aurélien Recoing as Internet Stranger
 Gérard Kuhnl as Murderer (as Gérard Kuhln)
 Valérie Dréville as Detective
 Gérard Watkins as Detective

References

External links
 

2010 films
English-language French films
2010s French-language films
2010 drama films
Films directed by Lodge Kerrigan
American drama films
French drama films
2010s English-language films
2010s American films
2010s French films
2010 multilingual films
American multilingual films
French multilingual films